Dactylococcus is a genus of green algae in the family Oocystaceae.

References

External links

Trebouxiophyceae genera
Trebouxiophyceae
Oocystaceae